Zavada or Závada (Czech/Slovak feminine: Závadová) as a surname may refer to:

Barbora Závadová (born 1993), Czech swimmer
Clay Zavada (born 1984), American baseball player
Pál Závada (born 1954), Slovak-Hungarian writer
Vilém Závada (1905–1982), Czech poet and translator

See also

Zawada (surname)

Czech-language surnames
Slovak-language surnames